Chris Gardner nicknamed "Stan" (born 19 October 1955) is an Australian former rugby league footballer who played in the 1970s and 1980s.  He played for Cronulla-Sutherland in the New South Wales Rugby League (NSWRL) competition.

Playing career
Gardner made his first grade debut for Cronulla in Round 3 1978 against the Parramatta Eels at Cumberland Oval.  In 1978,  Cronulla finished 2nd on the table and qualified for the finals.  Cronulla defeated Manly in the opening week of the finals series 17-12.  Cronulla then defeated minor premiers Western Suburbs to reach their second grand final against Manly.

After just 4 games in first grade, Gardner was selected to play in the 1978 NSWRL grand replay to replace Mick Mullane Jr. who was injured in the first final.  Just 3 days earlier, Manly and Cronulla played out an 11-11 draw and were required to return and play again on a Tuesday afternoon.  Both Manly and Cronulla went into the replay with tired players but it was Manly who prevailed in the replay 16-0 winning their fourth premiership in front of a low crowd of 33,552.

In 1979, Cronulla reached the minor semi-final against Canterbury-Bankstown but were defeated 30-15 with Gardner playing at centre.  In 1981, Cronulla again reached the finals but once again Manly proved to be their nemesis defeating them 14-11 in the minor preliminary final.  In 1983, Gardner finished equal top try scorer in the competition with 17 tries, but Cronulla finished a disappointing 9th on the table.  Gardner retired at the end of the 1985 season scoring a total of 44 tries in 128 games.

Coaching
Chris was briefly head-coach of Bramley Buffaloes in April 2011.

References

1955 births
Living people
Bramley Buffaloes coaches
Cronulla-Sutherland Sharks players
Rugby league wingers
Rugby league centres
Rugby league players from Sydney